Sir Michael de Courcy Fraser Holroyd  (born 27 August 1935) is an English biographer.

Early life and education
Holroyd was born in London, the son of Basil de Courcy Fraser Holroyd (a descendant of Sir George Sowley Holroyd, Justice of the King's Bench, whose ancestor was Isaac Holroyd, younger brother of George, the great-great-grandfather of John Baker Holroyd, 1st Earl of Sheffield), and his wife, Ulla (known as "Sue"), daughter of Karl Knutsson-Hall, a Swedish army officer. His parents having separated- their son "left to grow up in a bewilderingly extended family, shunted back and forth among parents and stepparents and grandparents and uncles and aunts"- Holroyd was raised at his father's family home, Norhurst, at Maidenhead, Berkshire. The Holroyds "for a time enjoyed a small fortune", provided by, amongst other things, an Indian tea plantation; this fortune was eventually "done in by mismanagement of resources and foolish investments" including investment in Lalique glassware, his grandfather having been its sole London agent in the 1920s. The Holroyd family had been "for several centuries" Yorkshire "butchers, clergymen, clothiers, farmers, landowners, soldiers, yeoman (sic) of all kinds".

He was educated at Eton College, though he has often claimed Maidenhead Public Library as his alma mater.

Career
In 1964, Holroyd published his first book, a biography of the writer Hugh Kingsmill; his reputation was consolidated in 1967–68 with the publication of his two-volume life of Lytton Strachey (which the playwright Christopher Hampton later used extensively when writing the screenplay for the 1995 film Carrington). Holroyd has also written biographies of Augustus John and, in four volumes, of Bernard Shaw. His book A Book of Secrets: Illegitimate Daughters, Absent Fathers (2010) concerns the Villa Cimbrone on the Gulf of Salerno and the Edwardian literary and society figures who lived there, such as Ernest Beckett, 2nd Baron Grimthorpe.

Lytton Strachey: A Critical Biography (1967, 1968) became Holroyd's definitive work. He published a revised version in 1994 under the revised subtitle The New Biography.

Holroyd was chairman of the Society of Authors, 1973–83, and from 1985 to 1988 was president of the English branch of PEN. He is also President of the Shaw Society. His awards include the 2001 Heywood Hill Literary Prize and the 2005 David Cohen Prize for literature. In 2006, he was awarded the Golden PEN Award by English PEN for "a Lifetime's Distinguished Service to Literature". He was president of the Royal Society of Literature from 2003 to 2008, and was knighted in the 2007 New Year Honours List. Holroyd is a patron of Dignity in Dying.

Personal life
Holroyd is married to the author Margaret Drabble.

Awards
1968—Yorkshire Post Book Award (Book of the Year): Lytton Strachey: A Critical Biography
1988—Irish Life Arts Award
1989—CBE
1995—Prix du Meilleur Livre Etranger (France)
2001—Heywood Hill Literary Prize
2003—Golden PEN Award
2005—David Cohen British Literature Prize
2007—Knighted for services to English Literature
2008—James Tait Black Memorial Prize
2010—Lifetime Services to Biography Award

Bibliography

 
 Lytton Strachey: A Critical Biography, volume 1: The Unknown Years (1880-1910), Heinemann, 1967
 Lytton Strachey: A Critical Biography, volume 2: The Years of Achievement (1910-1932), Heinemann, 1968
 A Dog's Life, Henry Holt (US only), 1969
 The Best of Hugh Kingsmill: Selections from his Writings (editor), Gollancz, 1970
 Lytton Strachey by Himself: A Self-Portrait (editor), Heinemann, 1971
 Unreceived Opinions, Heinemann, 1973
 Augustus John: A Biography, volume 1: The Years of Innocence, Heinemann, 1974
 The Art of Augustus John (with Malcolm Easton), Secker & Warburg, 1974
 Augustus John: A Biography, volume 2: The Years of Experience, Heinemann, 1975
 The Genius of Shaw: A Symposium (editor), Hodder & Stoughton, 1979
 The Shorter Strachey (editor with Paul Levy), Oxford University Press, 1980
 William Gerhardie: God's Fifth Column: A Biography of the Age: 1890-1940 (editor with Robert Skidelsky), Hodder & Stoughton, 1981
 Essays by Divers Hands, (editor), Boydell Press, 1982
 Peterley Harvest: The Private Diary of David Peterley (introduction), Secker & Warburg, 1985
 Bernard Shaw, volume 1: 1856-1898: The Search for Love, Chatto & Windus, 1988
 Bernard Shaw, volume 2: 1898-1918: The Pursuit of Power, Chatto & Windus, 1989
 Bernard Shaw, volume 3: 1918-1950: The Lure of Fantasy, Chatto & Windus, 1991
 Bernard Shaw, volume 4: 1950-1991: The Last Laugh, Chatto & Windus, 1992
 The Shaw Companion, Chatto & Windus, 1992
 Lytton Strachey: The New Biography, Chatto & Windus, 1994
 Augustus John: The New Biography, Chatto & Windus, 1996
 Bernard Shaw (one-volume revised edition), Chatto & Windus, 1997
 Basil Street Blues, Little, Brown, 1999
 The Whispering Gallery: Leaves from a Diplomat's Diary by Hesketh Pearson, (introduction), Phoenix Press, 2000
 Works on Paper: The Craft of Biography and Autobiography, Little, Brown, 2002
 Swedish Reflections: From Beowulf to Bergman (preface), Arcadia Books, 2003
 Mosaic, Little, Brown, 2004
 A Strange Eventful History: The Dramatic Lives of Ellen Terry, Henry Irving and their Remarkable Families, Chatto & Windus, 2008
 A Book of Secrets: Illegitimate Daughters, Absent Fathers, Chatto & Windus, 2010
 On Wheels, 2013
Critical studies and reviews of Holroyd's work
  Reviews A book of secrets.

See also
James Strachey
Philippa Pullar

Notes

External links
 
 
"Portrait of a portrait painter": an essay by Michael Holroyd about having his portrait painted from TLS, 1 April 2009

1935 births
Living people
English biographers
Writers from London
20th-century male writers
20th-century biographers
Bloomsbury Group biographers
People educated at Eton College
People educated at Scaitcliffe School
Knights Bachelor
Commanders of the Order of the British Empire
James Tait Black Memorial Prize recipients
David Cohen Prize recipients
Fellows of the Royal Historical Society
Fellows of the Royal Society of Literature
Presidents of the Royal Society of Literature
Presidents of the English Centre of PEN